Chaitanya Reddy (born 15 October 1995) is an Indian cricketer. He made his List A debut for Hyderabad in the 2017–18 Vijay Hazare Trophy on 5 February 2018. He made his Twenty20 debut for Hyderabad in the 2018–19 Syed Mushtaq Ali Trophy on 27 February 2019. He made his first-class debut on 25 December 2019, for Hyderabad in the 2019–20 Ranji Trophy.

References

External links
 

1995 births
Living people
Indian cricketers
Place of birth missing (living people)
Hyderabad cricketers